is a Japanese rotoscoped youth drama film written and directed by Shunji Iwai. It is the prequel to Iwai's 2004 live-action film, Hana and Alice. The film was released on February 20, 2015. A manga adaptation by Dowman Sayman began serialization in Shogakukan's Yawaraka Spirits magazine from February 16, 2015.

Plot
Tetsuko "Alice" Arisugawa moves into the neighborhood of Fujiko with her divorced mom.  While moving in her new home, Alice notices a strange girl her age spying from the neighboring house, and finds a stash of tests with bad grades in her own bedroom closet.  At her new school, her teacher Ms. Ogino assigns her one of two desks that strangely do not get dusted, and that sit on top of letters written on the floor.  Her fellow students keep talking about an evil spirit named Judas with "four wives".  A heavily made-up student named Mutsu "Moo" Mutsumi even accuses her of releasing the evil spirit, and leads the class in an elaborate ceremony to reseal it.

Later on, Moo admits to Alice that she was playacting.  The previous year's class had a story of a boy named Judas that had four wives until one poisoned him to death with "anaphylaxis".  Moo originally sat in Judas's desk and was teased for it, but she thwarted the bullying by embracing the story, pretending to have been possessed by and then freed from Judas, and changing her look to resemble a witch.  Moo notes that the only remaining student with first hand knowledge of the story is Hana Arai, who's been held back because she's cut so many classes.  At home, Alice looks closer at the tests and finds they belong to "Kotaro Yuda".  She realizes that Yuda is the "Judas" from the story, and that Hana is the strange girl from next door.

Alice sneaks into Hana's house and confronts her about the story.  Hana tells her she doesn't know if Kotaro Yuda is really dead.  But she knows Kotaro's father, and drafts Alice into a plan to trick him into revealing Kotaro's fate.  The next day, Alice goes to the corporation where Kotaro's father works, but botches the plan, winding up spending the day with one of his coworkers instead.  She eventually catches up to Hana, who turns out to know where the Yudas live.  They spy on the home waiting for Kotaro, but lose track of the time and wind up missing the last train home.  They take shelter underneath a truck, and Hana tells the whole truth to Alice:  Kotaro had been a long time crush of Hana's.  Hana would always give him a Kit Kat bar for Valentine's Day, but Kotaro never reciprocated.  Finally last year, Hana gave him a made up marriage certificate to show her feelings for him.  But Kotaro then went on to hand out his own marriage certificates to other girls in the class.  An angry Hana then stuck a bee down Kotaro's shirt.  Right when Kotaro announced to the class that he was moving away, the bee stung him, leaving him writhing in pain on the floor.  Hana overheard students speculate that Kotaro could die of anaphylactic shock, and fear that she might have killed him drove her to stop going to school.

The next morning Hana wakes up early to continue spying.  Alice barely avoids getting run over by the truck she was sleeping under, but panics when she mistakenly believes Hana is still stuck on the bottom of the truck.  In the ensuing confusion, Hana and Alice finally run into Kotaro Yuda, apparently now fine.  Alice forces Hana to confront Kotaro, who tells her that he knew she put that bee in his shirt, and will never forget the pain.  Hana actually takes comfort in Kotaro's words as an indication that he loves her.

Days later, Alice's new school uniform arrives, and Hana now feels able to put her old uniform on and return to school.

Voice cast

Yū Aoi as Tetsuko "Alice" Arisugawa (有栖川 徹子 Arisugawa Tetsuko, アリス Arisu)
Anne Suzuki as Hana Arai (荒井 花 Arai Hana)
Ryo Katsuji as Kotaro Yuda (湯田光太郎 Yuda Kōtarō)
Haru Kuroki as Ogino Satomi
Tae Kimura as Yuki Sakaki (ballet teacher)
Sei Hiraizumi as Kenji Kuroyanagi (黒柳健次 Kuroyanagi Kenji)  (Alice's father)
Shoko Aida as Kayo Arisugawa (有栖川 加代 Arisugawa Kayo) (Alice's mother)
Ranran Suzuki as Mutsu Mutsumi
Tomohiro Kaku as Tomonaga (朝長先生 Tomonaga-sensei)
Midoriko Kimura as Tomomi Arai (荒井友美 Arai Tomomi) (Hana's mother)

Release
In English-speaking regions, the film has been licensed and released straight to home video in the United Kingdom and Ireland by Anime Limited in Japanese with English subtitles only and in the United States and Canada by GKIDS.

Reception
Andrew Osmond of Anime News Network gave the film an overall grade of B+ and said that "despite its aesthetic issues and a meandering start, Hana & Alice is a highly likable film about hugely likable teens."

The film won the Bronze Audience Award for best animated feature film at the 19th Fantasia International Film Festival.

References

External links
  in Nippon TV Program Catalog
  at GKIDS
 

2010s teen drama films
2015 anime films
2015 manga
Animated drama films
Coming-of-age anime and manga
Drama anime and manga
Films directed by Shunji Iwai
Nippon TV films
Japanese teen drama films
Production I.G
Rotoscoped films
Seinen manga
Shogakukan manga
Webcomics in print